Mandy can be used as a given name, a diminutive, or a nickname, for both female and male genders. It is often used as a diminutive (i.e., short form, see hypocorism) of the female names Amanda and Miranda, as well as being a given name in its own right. It is also used as a nickname for the male names Armand, Armando, Mandel, or Emmanuel. Variants, for both male and female, include Mandi, Mandie, and Manda.

Its usage as a popular female name can be traced back to at least the beginning of the 20th century, with the song "Mandy" by Irving Berlin in 1919, and the Milly-Molly-Mandy series of children's books by Joyce Lankester Brisley in the 1920s. The pop songs "Mandy" by Barry Manilow (1974) and the Irish boyband Westlife (2003) and "I'm Mandy Fly Me" by 10cc (1976) speak to the resurgent popularity of the name in more recent times.

Given name

Women 
Mandy Aftel, American perfumer
Mandy Boyd (born 1991), New Zealand lawn bowls player
Mandy Butcher (born 1986), Canadian actress
Mandy Capristo (born 1990), German singer
Mandy Cho (born 1982), American-born beauty contestant and actress in Hong Kong
Mandy Clark (born 1982), American voice actress
Mandy Coon, American fashion designer
Mandy Davies (born 1966), British Olympic field hockey player
Mandie Fletcher (born 1954), English television and film director
Mandie Godliman (born 1973), English Test cricketer
Mandy Gonzalez, American stage actress
Mandy Grunwald (born 1958), American political strategist
Mandy Haase (born 1982), German Olympic field hockey player
Mandy Haberman (born 1956), British inventor and entrepreneur
Mandy Harvey (born 1988), American deaf jazz musician
Mandy de Jongh (born 1961), Dutch taekwondo champion
Mandy Leach (born 1979), Zimbabwean Olympic swimmer
Mandy Maywood (born 1974), Australian Paralympic swimmer
Mandy McCartin (born 1958), British artist
Mandy Minella (born 1985), Luxembourgish professional tennis player
Mandy Mohamed (born 2000), Dutch-Egyptian artistic gymnast
Mandy Mulder (born 1987), Dutch champion sailor
Mandy Ord (born 1974), Australian comic artist
Mandy Planert (born 1975), German slalom canoer
Mandy Sellars (born 1975), British woman possibly afflicted by Proteus syndrome
Mandy Stadtmiller (born 1975), American writer, comedienne and newspaper columnist
Mandy Teefey (born 1976), American film director; see Selena Gomez
Mandy Van Deven (born 1980), American feminist writer and activist
Mandy Walker (born 1963), Australian cinematographer
Mandy Wötzel (born 1973), German champion figure skater
Mandy Wright (born 1977), American educator and politician

Men 
Mandy Juruni (born 1967), Ugandan basketball coach
Mandy Yachad (born 1960), South African cricketer and field hockey player

Nickname

Women 
Amanda "Mandy" Barnett (born 1975), American country music singer
Amanda "Mandy" Chessell (born c. 1965), British computer scientist
Mandy Chiang (born 1982), Hong Kong pop singer and actress
Amanda "Mandy" Cavan (née Clemens) (born 1978), American soccer player
Amanda "Mandy" Drennan (born 1988), Australian Paralympic swimmer
Amanda "Mandy" Hager (born 1960), New Zealand children's book author
Amanda "Mandy" Johnstone (born 1972), Australian politician
Amanda "Mandy" Loots (born 1976), South African Olympic swimmer
Carmen "Mandy" Miller (born 1944), British actress, child star of the 1952 film Mandy
Amanda "Mandy" Moore (born 1984), American pop singer
Samantha "Mandy" Moore (born 1976), American dancer and choreographer
Marilyn "Mandy" Rice-Davies (born 1944), British model
Amanda "Mandy" Smith (born 1970), British pop singer, model and actress
Amanda "Mandy" Barker (née Smith) (born 1972), New Zealand Olympic field hockey player
Mandy Tam (born 1957), Hong Kong politician, tax advisor and newspaper columnist
Amanda "Mandy" Ventrice (born 1985), American recording artist
Mandy Wong (born 1982), Hong Kong actress

Men 
Steve "Mandy" Hill (1940–2010), British footballer
Mandy Lion (born c. 1970), German heavy metal singer
Peter "Mandy" Mandelson (born 1953), British Labour politician
Norman "Mandy" Mitchell-Innes (1914–2006), English cricketer
Mandel "Mandy" Patinkin (born 1952), American actor
Armando "Mandy" Romero (born 1967), American baseball player

Fictional characters
 Mandy, a professional assassin in the American TV series 24
 Mandy, in the American animated TV series The Grim Adventures of Billy & Mandy
 Mandy, recurring character and villainess in the French and Canadian animated TV series Totally Spies!
 Mandy Carter, in the British TV series Ackley Bridge
 Mandy Dingle, in the British TV series Emmerdale
 Mandy Hampton, in the American TV series The West Wing
 Mandy Hope, in the children's book series Animal Ark
 Mandy Hutchinson, in the British TV series Hollyoaks
 Mandy Garland, in the 1952 British film Mandy
 Mandy Salter, in the British TV series EastEnders
 Mandy Valdez, in the American TV series iCarly
 Mandy Winger, in the American TV series Dallas
 Mandy, a character in the 2019 film UglyDolls
 Mandy Milkovich, a character in the American TV series Shameless

See also 

 Mady
 Maddy
 Unisex name
 Maddie

English feminine given names
Feminine given names
Lists of people by nickname
Hypocorisms
English masculine given names
Masculine given names
English unisex given names
Unisex given names